The first USS Bridge (AF-1) was a stores ship in service with the United States Navy from 1917 to 1946. Following a short commercial service, she was scrapped in 1953.

Early career 
Bridge was launched on 18 May 1916 at the Boston Navy Yard; sponsored by Mrs. Granville Searcy Fleece, a grandniece of Commodore Bridge; and commissioned on 2 June 1917. Following her commissioning Bridge loaded stores and provisions, and transported and issued them to the fleet and shore stations.

World War I 
During 1917–18 she made four round trips across the Atlantic as a unit of the Naval Overseas Transportation Service. On 1 July 1918, while at New York City, Bridge was assigned to the Train, United States Atlantic Fleet, and operated between New York City, the York River in Virginia, and the Chesapeake Bay.

 Inter-war period 
In 1922 Bridge steamed for Europe and duty with the U.S. Naval Detachment in Turkish Waters. Remaining a year in that area, she then joined Train, Squadron 1, Base Force, U.S. Fleet, in servicing and provisioning the Fleet from bases on both the east and west coasts of the United States, the Caribbean, and Canal Zone. In 1937–38 Bridge spent six months on temporary duty with the Asiatic Fleet. In 1940–41 she made 11 voyages between California bases and Pearl Harbor; the tenth trip also included the outlying bases of Midway Island, Guam and Wake Island.

One of Bridge's commanding officers during the 1920s was Ernest J. King, future Chief of Naval Operations and Commander-in-Chief, United States Fleet during World War II.

 World War II 
With the entry of the United States into World War II Bridge expanded her Pacific voyages to include the Fiji, Tonga, and New Caledonia Islands. Between 10 August and 20 October 1942 she shuttled cargo between San Francisco and Alaska and then returned to the South Pacific. Between October 1942 and April 1943 she carried cargo to the Hawaii, Tonga, Loyalty Islands, and Samoan Islands. From 2 April until 3 July 1943 she ferried supplies between Nouméa, New Caledonia, and Auckland, New Zealand. In July she steamed to San Francisco and thence to Alaska where she operated until October. She returned to Pearl Harbor on 3 November and operated between the Hawaiian and Ellice Islands until April 1944. Between 19 April 1944 and 27 April 1945 Bridge operated exclusively between Pearl Harbor and the Marshall Islands. During 9–22 May and 11 July-13 August 1945 she landed supplies at Okinawa, returning to Pearl Harbor each time.

On 10 October 1945 Bridge departed Pearl Harbor and steamed to Japan, via Okinawa, for occupation duty. While operating off Korea on 1 November, she struck a mine and suffered considerable damage but no personnel casualties. Bridge remained on occupation duty until June 1946. She was decommissioned at Sasebo on 27 June 1946, turned over to the Foreign Liquidation Commission for disposal and was sold to Madrigal Shipping Company, Manila, Philippines, on 22 December 1947. She was renamed SS Don Jose and was scrapped in Japan by Kudamatsu in March 1953.Bridge'' received one battle star for her World War II service.

References

External links 
 Ships of the U.S. Navy, 1940-1945 AF-1 USS Bridge

Ships built in Boston
1916 ships
Stores ships of the United States Navy
World War I auxiliary ships of the United States
World War II auxiliary ships of the United States